The Aerospace Walk of Honor in Lancaster, California, USA, honors test pilots who have contributed to aviation and space research and development.

The Aerospace Walk of Honor awards were established in 1990 by the City of Lancaster "to recognize the important contributions of unique and talented aviators who soared above the rest." Lancaster is located in the Antelope Valley, near four flight test facilities: US Air Force Plant 42, Edwards AFB, Mojave Air and Space Port and Naval Air Weapons Station China Lake. The Walk of Honor program officially concluded in August 2009.

The Walk of Honor is located on Lancaster Boulevard between Sierra Highway to the east and 10th Street West and is anchored by Boeing Plaza, which has a restored F-4 Phantom II on display. Honorees are memorialized with granite monuments located along Lancaster Boulevard. Test pilots who receive awards were inducted annually in late summer.

The Walk of Honor monuments and activities are funded by several aerospace companies, including Boeing, Lockheed Martin and Northrop Grumman, all of which perform flight test operations in the Antelope Valley.

Inductees

(Alphabetical, with year of induction)

 Clarence E. "Bud" Anderson, 1993
 Harry Andonian, 2009
 Neil Armstrong, 1991
 Fred J. Ascani, MGen USAF, 1999
 Frank T. Birk, 2001
 Charles C. "Charlie" Bock, Jr., 1994
 Albert Boyd, 1991
 Irving L. Burrows, 2008
 Stanley P. "Stan" Butchart, 1999
 Robert L. Cardenas, 1995
 Marion E. Carl, 1992
 Henry E. "Hank" Chouteau, 1996
 Jacqueline Cochran, 2006
 Eileen Collins, 2008
 Michael Collins, 2008
 Gordon Cooper, 2008
 Joseph F. Cotton, 1997
 Robert Crippen, 2007
 Albert Scott Crossfield, 1990
 William H. Dana, 1993
 James H. Doolittle, 1990
 Gordon Fullerton, 1936-2013 TBA
 James D. Eastham, 2003
 Glen W. Edwards, 1995
 Joe H. Engle, 1992
 Robert C. Ettinger, 2007
 Mervin L. Evenson, Colonel, USAF, 2006
 Frank Kendall Everest, Jr, 1991
 John A. Fergione, 2009
 David L. "Ferg" Ferguson, 1998
 Fitzhugh L. "Fitz" Fulton, Jr., 1991
 Jerauld R. "Jerry" Gentry, 1993
 John H. Griffith, 2006
 Fred W. Haise, 1995
 Lt. Col. Bruce Hinds, USAF, 1999
 Robert A. "Bob" Hoover, 1992
 Jesse P. "Jake" Jacobs, Jr., 1996
 Richard L. "Dick" Johnson, 1998
 Iven Carl Kincheloe, Jr., 1992
 William J. Knight, 1990
 Fred D. Knox, Jr., 2006
 Tony LeVier, 1990
 Maj. Wallace A. "Wally" Lien, 2005
 James McDivitt, 2009
 John B. "Jack" McKay, 1996
 Thomas C. McMurtry, 1998
 Corwin H. "Corky" Meyer, 1999
 Arthur K. "Kit" Murray, 1997
 Lewis A. Nelson, 2007 
 William C. Park, 1995
 Bruce Peterson, 2003
 Robert O. "Bob" Rahn, 1994
 Jack Ridley, 1996
 Colonel Joseph W. Rogers, USAF, 2004
 Robert A. "Bob" Rushworth, 1994
 Herman Richard "Fish" Salmon, 1994 
 Louis W. "Lou" Schalk, 1999
 Joe Schiele, 2008
 Edward T. Schneider, 2005
 Wendell H. "Wendy" Shawler, 1998
 Max R. Stanley, 1993
 Robert L. "Silver Fox" Stephens, 1998
 Emil Sturmthal, Colonel, USAF, 2006
 Richard G. Thomas, 2005
 Milton O. Thompson, 1993
 Guy M. Townsend, 1995
 Charles Tucker, 2007
 Joseph John "Tym" Tymczyszyn, 2004
 Joseph A. Walker, 1991
 George Welch, 2007
 Alvin S. "Al" White, 1994
 Robert M. "Bob" White, 1992
 Jack Fraser Woodman, 2009
 Chuck Yeager, 1990
 Jean L. "Skip" Ziegler, 2009

See also
 North American aviation halls of fame
 List of halls and walks of fame

References

External links
 City of Lancaster's web pages for the Walk of Honor
 AWOH.org, the Walk's official web site, is inactive as of January 2007; this is archive.org's backup from February 2005

Aviation halls of fame
Walks of fame
Halls of fame in California
Buildings and structures in Lancaster, California
Awards established in 1990
Tourist attractions in Los Angeles County, California
Monuments and memorials in California
Neil Armstrong